The NHS Purchasing and Supply Agency was an executive agency of the Department of Health (DH) in the United Kingdom.

It was the purchasing arm of the National Health Service in England and had main offices in Chester and Reading.  The Agency was self-funding in that it did not charge either suppliers or customers.

None of the Agency's contracts were mandatory, although until mid-2006 there was an increasing tendency to insist on their use; especially for NHS trusts who were in sufficient financial distress to have turn-around teams installed by the DH.

The Agency closed in April 2010 with its functions being split between the DH and other government agencies, including NHS Supply chain.

References

Defunct executive agencies of the United Kingdom government
Defunct organisations based in England
Government procurement in the United Kingdom
Organisations based in Cheshire
Government agencies disestablished in 2010